Chris or Christopher Cook may refer to:

Entertainment
 Christopher Cook (artist) (born 1959), British painter
 Christopher Cook (composer) (born 1962), American composer
 Christopher Cook (writer) (born 1952), American writer
 Christopher D. Cook (born 1988), British composer and conductor
 Christopher Matthew Cook, American actor

Sports
 Chris Cook (American football) (born 1987), American football player
 Chris Cook (bodybuilder), American professional bodybuilder
 Chris Cook (racing driver) (born 1971), American racing driver and instructor
 Chris Cook (rugby union) (born 1991), English rugby union player
 Chris Cook (skier) (born 1980), American Olympic skier
 Chris Cook (soccer) (born 1968), American soccer player
 Chris Cook (swimmer) (born 1979), English swimmer

Other people
 Chris Cook (energy market strategist), British academic and businessman
 Chris Cook (sailor) (born 1974), Canadian sailor in the Finn class

See also
 Christian Cook (born 1975), American lacrosse player
 Christian Cooke (born 1987), English television actor
 Christine Cook (born 1970), English field hockey player